The Green Berets was a military organization founded in Sarajevo in early 1992. They were founded by demobilized soldiers and conscripts from the Yugoslav National Army (JNA) who were mostly ethnic Bosniaks and supporters of the elected government of Bosnia and Herzegovina. They were integrated into a newly founded Army of the Republic of Bosnia and Herzegovina in the second half of 1992. The Green Berets as a gear of choice and name was selected both as a reference to the United States Army Special Forces (the "Green Berets") (although no actual relation existed) and as a common colour brand of the predominant ethnic group that composed the unit, namely Bosniaks. Bosnian Green Berets were mostly active during the war in the early part of 1992 in northern and central Bosnia.

References 

Military units and formations of the Bosnian War
Paramilitary organizations in the Yugoslav Wars
Military wings of political parties